Alyxandra Margaret "A. M." Dellamonica (born February 25, 1968) is a Canadian science fiction writer who has published over forty short stories in the field since the 1980s. Dellamonica writes in a number of subgenres including science fiction, fantasy, and alternate history. Their stories have been selected for "Year's Best" science fiction anthologies in 2002 and 2007. Dellamonica is non-binary.

They attended Clarion West Writers Workshop in 1995 and they are a student in the UBC Opt-Res Creative Writing MFA program.

Dellamonica teaches creative writing online at the UCLA Extension Writer's Program and in person at UTSC. They also review science fiction novels and write articles about publishing for science fiction related websites like Clarkesworld and for tor.com.

Their first novel, Indigo Springs, was published by Tor Books in November 2009. Their fourth novel, A Daughter of No Nation, was published in December 2015. Dellamonica's most recent novel is their fifth, The Nature of a Pirate.

Nominations and awards
Dellamonica's Joan of Arc alternate history story "A Key to the Illuminated Heretic" was nominated for the 2005 Sidewise Award for Alternate History and was on the 2005 Preliminary Nebula Ballot. In 2005, they received the Canada Council for the Arts' Grant for Emerging Artists
and in 2015 they received the Ontario Arts Council Grant for Writers' Works in Progress. Dellamonica's first novel, Indigo Springs, was awarded the 2010 Sunburst Award for Canadian Literature of the Fantastic. In 2016, their fourth novel A Daughter of No Nation won the Prix Aurora Award for Best Novel.

Bibliography

Novels

Indigo Springs
Indigo Springs, 2009
Blue Magic, 2012

The Hidden Sea Tales
Child of a Hidden Sea, 2014
A Daughter of No Nation, 2015
The Nature of a Pirate, 2016

Short fiction
"Lucre's Egg," in Crank! Magazine (1994)
"Jailbreak," in Terminal Fright Magazine (1996)
"Homage," in Crank! Magazine (1996)
"Crusader," in Tomorrow Speculative Fiction Magazine (1996)
"Love Equals Four, Plus Six," in Realms of Fantasy Magazine (1996)
"Furlough," in Pirate Writings Magazine (1996)
"Prodigal," in Audio Versions (1998)
"The Man with No Motive," in Writer's Block Magazine (1997)
"The One Act," in Realms of Fantasy Magazine (1997)
"Novice," in anthology 365 Scary Stories (1998)
"The Dark Hour," in anthology Tesseracts 8 (1999)
"Nevada," in webzine SCIFI.COM (2001)
"The Girl Who Ate Garbage," co-written with Jessica Reisman in webzine SCIFI.COM (2001)
"Three Times over the Falls," in webzine SCIFI.COM (2002)
"Living the Quiet Life," in webzine Oceans of the Mind (2003)
"A Slow Day at the Gallery," in Isaac Asimov's Science Fiction Magazine (2002)
"Living the Quiet Life," in webzine Oceans of the Mind (2003)
"The Riverboy," in anthology Land/Space (2003)
"Cooking Creole," in anthology Mojo: Conjure Stories (2003)
"The Children of Port Allain," in On Spec Magazine (2003)
"Faces of Gemini," in anthology Girls Who Bite Back: Mutants, Slayers, Witches and Freaks (2004)
"Origin of Species," in anthology The Many Faces of Van Helsing (2004)
"The Dream Eaters," in anthology The Faery Reel (2004)
"Ruby, in the Storm," in webzine SCIFI.COM (2004)
"The Spear Carrier," in webzine SCIFI.COM (2005)
"A Key to the Illuminated Heretic," in Harry Turtledove's anthology Alternate Generals III (2005), reprinted in Great Jones Street (2017)
"The Town on Blighted Sea," at Strange Horizons (2007)
"Time of the Snake," in anthology Fast Forward 1: Future Fiction from the Cutting Edge (2007)
"What Song the Sirens Sang," in newspaper 'Xtra West' (2007)
"Five Good Things about Meghan Sheedy," at Strange Horizons (2008)
"The Sorrow Fair," at Helix Speculative Fiction (2008)
"The Cage," on Tor.com (2010)
"The Sweet Spot,"  "The Sweet Spot," at Lightspeed (2012)
"Wild Things," on Tor.com (2012)
"The Color of Paradox", on Tor.com (2014)
"Tribes," in Strangers Among Us: Tales of the Bound and Unbound, edited by Susan Forest and Lucas K. Law, Laksa Media Group (2016)
"Bottleneck," The Sum of Us: THE SUM OF US, edited by Susan Forest and Lucas K. Law, from Laksa Media Group (2017)

Stormwrack prequel stories
These stories are prequels to the Hidden Sea Tales''.
"Among the Silvering Herd," on Tor.com (2012)
"The Ugly Woman of Castello di Putti," on Tor.com (2014)
"The Glass Galago," on Tor.com (2016)
"Losing Heart Among the Tall," on Tor.com (2017)
"The Boy Who Would Not Be Enchanted," Beneath Ceaseless Skies, (2016)

References

External links
Official site and blog
 

1968 births
Living people
Canadian fantasy writers
Canadian science fiction writers
Canadian LGBT novelists
Canadian non-binary writers
Writers from Calgary
Canadian lesbian writers
21st-century Canadian novelists
20th-century Canadian short story writers
21st-century Canadian short story writers
21st-century Canadian LGBT people
Lesbian novelists